The R746 road is a regional road in Ireland. It connects the R702 road at Doran's Cross, County Wexford with the R725 road at Croneyhorn, County Wicklow, via Bunclody.

References

Regional roads in the Republic of Ireland
Roads in County Wexford
Roads in County Wicklow